The 2018 Baloncesto Superior Nacional season was the 89th season of the Baloncesto Superior Nacional (BSN).

Piratas de Quebradillas was the defending champion.

League news
On September 1, the league announced it will not control the Atléticos de San Germán for the upcoming 2018 BSN season, after activating the team last season. There was a commitment to run the team under receivership for a single year until a new owner was found. The good performance of the team has raised the interest of several groups to buy the franchise with a view to the 2018 tournament. On September 14, league president Fernando Quiñones was hopeful that both the A's and Indians' franchise will see action next season under their own administrations although talks are still in preliminary stages. In the coming weeks will know the future of the Atléticos de San Germán and the Indios de Mayagüez in Baloncesto Superior Nacional (BSN).

On October 31, league president Fernando Quiñones, announced the tournament could begin in late April or early May.

The league held its first meeting since Hurricane Maria on November 16, 2017. The meeting was also attended with the representation of the franchises of Arecibo, Aguada, Bayamón, Guayama, Fajardo, Isabela, Santurce, San Germán, Ponce, Mayagüez and Quebradillas.

Teams

Venues and locations

Personnel and sponsorship

Regular season

Stage 1

Stage 2

Group A

Group B

Individual statistics

Points

Rebounds

Assists

Other statistics

Playoffs

Awards

Finals MVP

Most Valuable Player 
 Reyshawn Terry (Piratas de Quebradillas)

Rookie of the Year
 Ángel Rodríguez (Vaqueros de Bayamón)

Coach of the Year
 Nelson Colón (Vaqueros de Bayamón)

Owner of the Year
 Alfredo Gotay (Vaqueros de Bayamón)

Sixth Man of the Year
 Chris Gastón (Santeros de Aguada)

Most Improved Player
 Jonathan Rodríguez (Santeros de Aguada)

Comeback of the Year
 Jezreel De Jesús (Atléticos de San Germán)

Player movements

NBA 
List of players that have played in the 2017 BSN season to have been selected to play in the NBA in the United States.

References

External links 
 Official site 
 2018 BSN  at latinbasket.com

Baloncesto Superior Nacional